The United Kingdom is a hybrid unitary constitutional monarchy with parliamentary government. The national legislature is located in London, which also serves as the sole legislature in the region of England. As a result of devolution in the United Kingdom, the regions of Scotland, Wales and Northern Ireland have their own autonomous legislatures. The Greater London urban area has the only local government legislature in the country.

National
Parliament of the United Kingdom, located at the Palace of Westminster in London

Scotland
Scottish Parliament, located in Holyrood, Edinburgh

Northern Ireland
Northern Ireland Assembly, located at the Parliament Buildings in Belfast

Wales
Senedd Cymru, located at the Senedd building in Cardiff

Greater London
London Assembly, located in City Hall, London

See also
List of United States state legislatures
Legislative assemblies of Canadian provinces and territories
Parliaments of the Australian states and territories

United Kingdom
Legislatures